Sphenomorphus longicaudatus is a species of skink. It is found in Papua New Guinea.

References

longicaudatus
Reptiles of Papua New Guinea
Reptiles described in 1915
Taxa named by Nelly de Rooij
Skinks of New Guinea